John W. North High School is a public high school in Riverside, California, part of the Riverside Unified School District, and the home of the Huskies. It is an International Baccalaureate school.

History
John Wesley North High School was established in 1965 and named after the founder of Riverside, John W. North. In 2010, the California Court of Appeals Fourth District, Division 2 visited the school in an educational experience and as an outreach to young people. The Court heard two appeals in the school's theater.

In October 2021, a video went viral the footage displayed showed the math teacher Candice Reed at John W. North High School in Riverside Unified School District wearing a fake feather headdress while dancing around the classroom and chanting "SOH-CAH-TOA", which is a mnemonic for remembering a trigonometry principle. She was suspended.

Demographics
North has a diverse student body: 10.6% Caucasian, 71.1% Latino, 11.1% black, and 4.6% Asian. Many second languages are also spoken here, including Spanish, Korean, Chinese, Tagalog, and Urdu. Average class size is 30+ students.

International Baccalaureate
In 1987, John W. North High School became the nineteenth California high school admitted into the International Baccalaureate (IB) program. North High is one of the few schools in California that awards the International Baccalaureate (IB) Diploma and Certificate to students.

Advanced Placement
North is host to many Advanced Placement (AP) classes.

Academics
In the 2005 Academic Performance Index (API) Statewide Rank, on a scale of 1 to 10, North ranked 7. The same year, in the API Similar Schools Rank, North ranked 10. As of 2010, the school is rated 7 out of 10 overall.

Athletics

Extracurricular activities
North is home to many clubs and activities. This includes the "Advancement Via Individual Determination" (AVID) program which is designed to help motivate financially disadvantaged kids into college. North also has a number of academies: the Education and Human Services Academy, the Law and Protective Services Academy, and the Global Business Information and Technology Academy. It is also home to the Blue Star Regiment (BSR), North's marching band.

North's award-winning yearbook, the Aurora, received the National Yearbook Pacemaker Award in 2005, the highest honor given to a high school yearbook by NSPA. They won tenth place at the Spring 2008 JEA Conference in Anaheim. Also, North's newspaper, The North Star, has won numerous national awards for the quality of its competitive issues and website.  The North Star won third place in the 2017 Fall JEA/NSPA conference and won sixth place in 2019.

The school's Mock Trial has won first place in Riverside County in 1986, 1989, and 2000. The North Mock Trial team won second place in the 2000 California State Mock Trial competition.

Clubs/Activities:
 United Student League – Student Council
 Animal Rights Club
 Animators- Club that watches and shares interests of Anime
 Anime Club – Students interested in Anime
 Asian Student Union - Dedicated to teaching and exploring Asian culture.
 Aurora – School yearbook
 A.L.I.V.E. – A club of Christian fellowship
 Be Strong Club
 Best Buddies
 Between the Lines – Book Club
 Black Student Union – Dedicated to teaching and exploring African-American culture
 Blue Star Regiment – School Marching Band
 California Scholarship Federation
 Chess Club
 Chinese Honor Society
Cosmology Club
Comedy Sports
 Couture Club – Fashion Club
 Fellowship Christian Athletes
 Harlequins – Drama Club
HERd - Female empowerment and equality club
 Heritage Plan
 Interact
 Key Club (sponsored by Kiwanis)
 La Salsa Rica – Dance (Salsa) Club
 Math Club
 Multi-Cultural Council – Dedicated to teaching and exploring different cultures
 MEChA – Dedicated to teaching and exploring Mexican culture
 Middle Eastern Club
 Mock Trial
 Muslim Student Association
MyStrength Club
 The North Star Newspaper
 Junior Optimist Octagon International (sponsored by Optimist International)
 OPEN – Gay-Straight Alliance
 Husky Help Peer Tutoring
 Polynesian Club
 Red Cross Club
 Science Honor Society
 Spanish Honor Society
 Speech and Debate
 Static – Hip Hop Dance Crew

Athletics

Blue Star Regiment – Marching Band
 
The John W. North High School Blue Star Regiment  (BSR NorthBSR.com) is part of the school's Instrumental Music and Dance Program and consists of a modern corps-style competitive marching band with roughly 140 members. The BSR was founded approximately 30 years ago under the direction of Gary Locke, a Riverside Community College (RCC) band director. In 1980, the students came up with the Blue Star Regiment name and began competing.
 
In 2002, the Blue Star Regiment won the first SCSBOA 5A Championships. In 2003, they retained their title with their second consecutive first-place victory. Since their inception, BSR has won numerous sweepstakes awards at fall competitions, including in SCSBOA, WBA, and BOA. They have also performed with the RCC Marching Tigers and marched in the Pasadena Rose Parade. The BSR Drill Team took 1st in the 2006 United Spirit Association National Championships in Florida. Under the direction of Adam Kehl. In 2009, the BSR had the opportunity to perform in Jiang-men, China.
 
Since opening in 1965, the North High Instrumental Music program has had 11 directors and has trained many fine musicians. Initially, the program began with only a Concert and Pep Band program under Sam Terry's directorship. In 1968, George Brooks took over the band and founded the first marching band. In the 1970s, the Mitchell brothers, John and Alan, were successful in developing strong concert, jazz, and parade bands with tall flag and drill team units.
 
In the fall of 1979, the marching band went through a significant change under the new leadership of band director Gary Locke. He changed the look of the North High marching band from a traditional show style to a more modern combination of the new drum and bugle corps style. It was at this point in its history that the Blue Star Regiment was born and rapidly became successful in both competition and in entertainment. Eventually, Mr. and Mrs. Locke left North High to become the directors at RCC, where they presently teach.
 
During the tenure of Charles Craig, the BSR attempted a modern show that was a foreshadowing of the modern BSR. Mr. Craig took the BSR to its first Fiesta Bowl appearance, but was soon recruited away by another district that same year. Dale Leaman stepped in during the interim and turned down the directorship at the end of the year, refusing to work with a program that he could not redirect. Perry Hall, the BSR percussion adviser, was offered the job as the new director after a chaotic year. Mr. Hall quickly brought the BSR back to prominence by focusing on going "Back to Basics" with solidly-build and well-executed shows that featured all of BSR's groups. Mr. Hall's tenure is generally regarded as the most consistently successful period in the program's history with the BSR winning many championships, the Concert Band receiving superior ratings and the Drill Team continuing its dominance in Southern California. After four successful years, Mr. Hall was recruited away by another program.
 
Mike Hipp, the BSR brass instructor, became the next director, and held the position for three years. The BSRIMA, having adopted a new policy of support and non-interference in the creation of the shows, supported the marching program without reservation during this time. Under Mr. Hipp's tenure, BSR developed new numbers and their shows became increasingly more modern. The concert programs, however, suffered setbacks because of the lack of support. After later suffering setbacks with the marching band, Mr. Hipp also left for another school.
 
The next director was Pete Jackson who spend 12 years at North focusing the music program on providing numerous opportunities for students to become well-rounded performers. For example, the percussionists now participate fully in all concert and marching activities. The Concert Program now has a Wind Symphony, as well as a Concert Band, and the BSR's competitive field shows have earned a top 15 rankings from 1992 through 1997.

In 2001 the Drill Team won a Miss Dance Drill Team USA title in the small dance category, garnering them an invitation to the Miss Drill Team International Competition held in Adelaide, Australia. The drill team has traveled to Japan for competition and returned with a world title. And, under the direction of Christine Schive, the drill team now includes all members, instead of a select few. The Color Guard has also been highly successful, winning a gold medal in 1994 and expanding its membership as well.
 
In 2004, Adam Kehl was appointed BSR band director, kicking off five innovative and ground-breaking years, with BSR presenting cutting-edge field shows in the Western Band Association and expansion of BSR's subprograms and creation of the Measure B Project and Synergy groups. In two years, the winter guard progressed from WGASC Regional AA to Open Class. And, as a highlight of the era, in 2009, the Blue Star Regiment embarked on a 12-day adventure in China.
 
In 2011, the BSR was again under the direction of Pete Jackson.

Track and field
John W. North has always held great pride in their athletics, particularly their highly successful Track and Field Team, which has won more CIF and State titles than any other school in the Inland Empire.

The program took off when Charles Leathers, a former hurdler himself, became the head coach in the early 1990s.  In 1995 Joanna Hayes graduated from North with school records in the 100m and 300m Hurdles with times of 13.45 and 41.20.  She came back from the CIF California State Meet with gold as well as running with the 4 × 100 m and 4 × 400 m teams with state winning teams of 47.18 and 3:46.16.  She would later become the 2004 Olympic Gold Medal Winner in Athens in the 100m Hurdles and credits his coaching to the root of her success. Another prolific runner under Leathers was Nicole Hoxie.  A sophomore during Hayes' last year, Hoxie would go on to finish the 1997 State Meet with the fastest women's time in the 100m hurdles, an incredible time of 13.35, and become a two-time champion.  She also won gold with her 4 × 400 m team and a 300m hurdles time of 42.66. Hoxie went on to run successfully for the Texas Longhorns. The arrival of Nichole Denby also helped North's women's team.  As a hurdler, Denby set more records:  a school record of 13.20 seconds for 100m hurdles in 2000 and a best time of 41.53 in the 300m. Other women athletes at North included Keiana Shannon, April Holliverse, Chaunte Howard, Ashlee Brown, Domenique Manning, Lorainne King, Tanika Ward, Gayle Hunter, Kiersten Kirkland, Frances Chase-Dunn, and Marjani Maldonado. Together they had 12 CIF titles and 4 State titles, including back-to-back wins in 2006 and 2007.

In 2006 the men's team won the boys' State title.  In 2007, the 4 × 400 m team took second in the State final. At 41.12 seconds, North High holds the fastest 100m time in Riverside County.  Gutierrez currently holds the 400m North record with 46.79 seconds.  And, in 2009, Dante Holland broke the 800m school record running it in 1:53.42 and making it to State.

Under his tenure, Leathers coached both the boys' and girls' teams to back-to-back CIF championships, placing North among only seven schools to do so.  Since these heady successes, Coach Leather's command of the Huskies has come to an end and the team's prestige has slowly faded.  Most recently, Dante was the only participating member of the North High squad going to State.

Notable alumni

 Chris Claiborne, NFL linebacker, University of Southern California Football
 Duane Clemons, NFL linebacker, University of California, Berkeley
 Alvin Davis, MLB baseball player, 1984 American League Rookie of the Year
 Dan Dotson, star of Storage Wars
 Natalie Duran, star of American Ninja Warrior
 Danny Garcia, former MLB baseball player, New York Mets
 Mike Garcia, former MLB baseball player, Pittsburgh Pirates
 Ed Gray, NBA basketball player, Atlanta Hawks
 Joanna Hayes, Olympic track-and-field gold medalist
 Chaunte Howard, current American record holder in the high jump
 Adam Kennedy, MLB baseball player, Los Angeles Dodgers, Angels and others
 J.F. Lawton, screenwriter, with credits including Pretty Woman
 Malcolm Lee, NBA basketball player, drafted by Minnesota
 Chaunte Lowe, high jumper, world champion, Olympic medalist
 Aaron Peck (American football), NFL Tight End, Fresno State Football
 Clayton Sandell, ABC News correspondent
 Marcus Slaughter, NBA basketball player, undrafted free agent
 Susan Straight, writer and novelist, Professor at the University of California, Riverside

References

External links
 John W. North High School
 Riverside Unified School District

High schools in Riverside, California
Educational institutions established in 1965
International Baccalaureate schools in California
Public high schools in California
1965 establishments in California